The 2021 World Orienteering Championships were held from 3 to 9 July 2021 in Doksy, Czech Republic.

Schedule

Medal summary

Medal table

Men

Women

Mixed

References

External links
 Official website

World Orienteering Championships
2021 in Czech sport
International sports competitions hosted by the Czech Republic
Orienteering in the Czech Republic
World Orienteering Championships
2021 in orienteering